Nematopodini (or Nematopini) is a tribe of leaf-footed bugs in the family Coreidae. There are at least 20 genera and 160 described species in Nematopodini.

Genera
These 22 genera belong to the tribe Nematopodini:

 Cnemyrtus Stål, 1860 i c g
 Curtius Stål, 1870 i c g
 Grammopoecilus Stål, 1868 i c g
 Himella Dallas, 1852 i g
 Melucha Amyot and Serville, 1843 i c g
 Meluchamixia Brailovsky, 1987 i c g
 Mozena Amyot and Serville, 1843 i c g
 Nectoquintius Brailovsky and Barrera, 2003 i c g
 Nematopus Berthold in Latreille, 1827 i c g
 Neoquintius Brailovsky and Barrera, 1986 i c g
 Ouranion Kirkaldy, 1904 i c g
 Pachylis Le Peletier and Serville, 1825 i c g
 Papeocoris Brailovsky, 2003 i c g
 Piezogaster Amyot and Serville, 1843 i c g
 Quintius Stål, 1865 i c g
 Saguntus Stål, 1865 i c g
 Stenoquintius Brailovsky and Barrera, 2003 i g
 Thasopsis O'Shea, 1980 i c g
 Thasus Stål, 1865 i c g
 Tovarocoris Brailovsky, 1995 i c g
 Vivianadema Brailovsky, 1987 i c g
 Wilcoxina O'Shea, 1980 i c g

Data sources: i = ITIS, c = Catalogue of Life, g = GBIF, b = Bugguide.net

References

External links

 

 Bugguide.net. Tribe Nematopini

 
Coreinae